The George C. King Bridge (formerly known as the St. Patrick's Island Bridge and colloquially known as the Skipping Stone Bridge) is a pedestrian bridge that spans the Bow River just northeast of Downtown Calgary, Alberta, Canada. The bridge connects the neighbourhoods of East Village to the south and Bridgeland to the north, with access from the bridge to St. Patrick's Island Park in the middle of the river. The bridge was built by the Calgary Municipal Land Corporation (CMLC) as part of the wider redevelopment of the East Village neighbourhood, in tandem with a $45 million redevelopment of St. Patrick's Island Park. Planning for the new bridge began in 2009, with construction getting underway in 2012. The bridge opened on October 20, 2014. The bridge is known locally as the Skipping Stone Bridge due to the form of the bridge, which looks like a stone skipping across the river.

2013 flood 

During June 2013, Calgary and most of Southwestern Alberta were impacted by catastrophic floods. About 75 000 of Calgary's population of 1.2 million people at the time had to be evacuated from their homes as the rivers burst over their banks. The George C. King Bridge, being right over the Bow River and under construction at the time was partially supported on supports which were washed out by the river flow. The newly constructed bridge deck sagged and cracked. After the flood, it was decided that the entire bridge deck which had been completed to that time would have to be replaced, setting the project back by more than a year. However, 16 months later the bridge was opened to the public amid much fanfare, the first of the many bridges destroyed in the flood to be reconstructed.

See also
Calgary's East Village
Jack and Jean Leslie RiverWalk
St. Patrick's Island Park
List of bridges in Canada

References

King
Network arch bridges